Maharaja Surajmal Brij University, formerly Brij University, Bharatpur, is a state university located at Bharatpur, Rajasthan, India. , it operates from the campus of Maharani Shri Jaya College.

History
Brij University, Bharatpur was established in 2012 by the Government of Rajasthan through Brij University, Bharatpur Act, 2012 and K. D. Swami was appointed as the founder Vice Chancellor (VC). The Chancellor of the institute is the Governor of Rajasthan. In 2014, in commemoration of Maharaja Surajmal, it was renamed Maharaja Surajmal Brij University, Bharatpur through Brij University, Bharatpur (Change of Name) Act, 2014. In April 2016 Swami quit his position, citing harassment by Vijay Bansal as the cause, while Bansal accused Swami of "administrative and financial irregularities". Ashwani Kumar Bansal was appointed VC in February 2017 and R.K.S. Dhakarey replaced him in February 2020.

Affiliated colleges
The university affiliates colleges from two districts of Rajasthan, Bharatpur and Dholpur.
, the university has three affiliated law colleges, 23 B.Ed/M.Ed. colleges, 16 U.G./P.G. colleges and 19 B.Ed. & integrated colleges. Notable affiliated colleges include Maharani Shri Jaya College.

See also
 Maharaja Surajmal Institute of Technology

References

External links

Bharatpur, Rajasthan
Educational institutions established in 2012
2012 establishments in Rajasthan
Universities in Rajasthan